is a Japanese professional boxer. She has held the WBO female mini flyweight title since 24 April 2019.

Career

Early career
Born in Osaka, Saeki started practicing combat sports at the age of six with kickboxing. A few years later, whilst at elementary school, she picked boxing and began competing at amateur championships in Japan and world-wide, having several important wins, most notably in 2011 at the AIBA World Women's Youth Championships in Antalya and the 2014 Japanese Women's National Championships held in Shizuoka. Saeki finished her amateur career with a 35–9 record.

Professional career
After a successful amateur career, Saeki made her professional debut on May 27, 2018, against Floryvic Montero, winning the bout by unanimous decision after six rounds.

Saeki fought Wassana Kamdee on December 1, 2018, for the vacant WBO Asia Pacific female mini flyweight title, winning by technical knockout (TKO) in the third round.

On April 27, 2019, Saeki fought against Elizabeth López for the vacant WBO female mini flyweight title at the EDION Arena Osaka. Saeki won the fight by TKO in the sixth round.

Professional boxing record

External links

References

1996 births
Living people
Mini-flyweight boxers
Japanese women boxers
Sportspeople from Osaka
World Boxing Organization champions